A type set is a coin collection based on coin design or type.  Traditional collections consist of all dates within a series such as state quarters or Lincoln cent. 

Type sets are more popular for practicality and therefore are more common among younger or less wealthy coin collectors. Date sets are more common with more experienced and wealthy collectors, who focus on getting every year and mint for a series of coins.

Description and varieties
A Type Set may contain the designs of only one denomination.  For example, the dime has had 12 - 14 distinct designs.  The definition of what constitutes a design is subjective but collectors generally follow those listed in the authoritative Red Book (A Guide Book of United States Coins), which says: "A series of coins defined by a shared distinguishing design, composition, denomination, and other elements. For example, Barber dimes or Franklin half dollars.".  Professional numismatic associations such as PCGS (Professional Coin Grading Service) and NGC (Numismatic Guaranty Corporation) list around 140 entries in a complete set that includes copper, nickel, silver and gold. 
 
A complete Type Set consists of every design of every denomination authorized by Congress that was struck for public usage. This excludes such items as pattern coins or coins struck for particular occasions. It includes denominations that are no longer in existence - half cent, the two-cent piece, three-cent piece, twenty-cent piece and all gold coins. Designs were changed for a variety of reasons - historical, political, cultural, and as a reaction to public opinion. The Standing Liberty Quarter first minted in 1916 was immediately redesigned when it was noted that Liberty's breast was visible.  This change created a separate design.  The Indian Head nickel (Buffalo) appeared in 1913 but the FIVE CENTS began wearing away. The coin was immediately changed to lower the buffalo mound. In 1837, the dime was minted without stars drawing outrage and the offending stars were immediately returned.  The denomination "FIVE CENTS" was initially omitted on the V Nickel (the reverse carried a large V). Before the words could be added, enterprising tricksters gold-plated the coin and declared it a $5.00 gold piece.  The Indian head cent has 3 varieties: (1) No shield (1859), (2) Copper and nickel (1860–1863) and (3) Bronze (1864–1909). A list of all members of a Type Set are listed below.

A complete type set of paper currency within a given scope of collecting includes a representative sample of each major design and change, but excludes lesser variations (e.g., signature combinations, Treasury seal, overprints, etc.).

Collectors build variations of the ultimate set. For example, many do not include gold due to the prohibitive cost; other now omit designs before the year 1800. These are the most expensive due to several factors:  Poor quality of material, primitive machinery and working conditions, minuscule production numbers and general wear and loss after 200 years.  Most designs cover decades but some were minted for only one or two years making these the rarest of the entire set.  It is not a coincidence that many of these were also struck prior to 1800 when the Mint altered designs in response to unfavorable public opinion. The most famous of these short-lived designs are the half cent (1793), quarter (1796), Draped Bust, Small Eagle half dollar (1796–1797) and the three large cent designs minted in 1793 - Wreath cent, Chain cent and Liberty Cap Cent.  The Haig Koshkarian Type Set , one of the finest ever assembled, was auctioned in 2004.

Examples - copper, nickel, silver, gold

Complete Type Sets   - Silver / Copper / Bronze / Steel / Clad coins

Complete Type Sets   - Gold coins

Footnotes

Numismatics